Bella & Filippa is a Swedish duo from Upplands Väsby. It is made up of stepsisters Isabella Snihs (born ) and Filippa Frisell (born ). They are best known for taking part in Melodifestivalen 2017.

History

2013–2016: Beginnings
Bella & Filippa began their music careers in 2013 after launching their music blog, on which they've since accumulated over 50,000 followers. They frequently perform covers of songs by notable artists, such as Miriam Bryant, Tori Kelly, Shawn Hook, and Lukas Graham.

2017–present: Breakthrough and Melodifestivalen 2017
On 30 November 2016, the duo were announced to be competing in Melodifestivalen 2017 with the song "Crucified". They took part in the third semi-final held on 18 February 2017, and placed fifth, being eliminated from the competition. Snihs is the first artist born in the 2000s to ever take part in Melodifestivalen.

Discography

Singles

References

Swedish musical duos
2013 establishments in Sweden
Musical groups established in 2013
Musical groups from Stockholm County
English-language singers from Sweden
Warner Music Group artists
Female musical duos
Melodifestivalen contestants of 2017